Catocala editarevayae is a moth of the family Erebidae first described by Vasiliy D. Kravchenko et al. in 2008. It is known only from Jordan and Israel.

The wingspan is 87–90 mm. Adults are on wing from July to September.

The larvae are probably monophagous on Populus species.

References

editarevayae
Moths described in 2008
Moths of the Middle East